Chohtan is a constituency of the Rajasthan Legislative Assembly covering the city of Chohtan in the Barmer district of Rajasthan, India. Chohtan is one of eight assembly constituencies in the Barmer (Lok Sabha constituency).

List of MLAs

References

Assembly constituencies of Rajasthan
Barmer district